The Cape Town Civic Centre is a building on the Foreshore in central Cape Town, South Africa that serves as the headquarters of the City of Cape Town, the municipality that governs Cape Town and its suburbs.

It was completed in 1978 by Concor, and is made up of two blocks. The Podium Block is a low-rise building which houses the City management, including the Council Chamber and the Mayor's Office. The Tower Block is a 98-metre-tall, 26-floor high-rise block that houses the administrative offices of the municipality; it is a long, narrow building that crosses Hertzog Boulevard, with the road passing underneath the central part of the building. The arch where the road passes under the building acts as a very powerful wind tunnel and some of the highest windspeeds can be found along this corridor. This has at times endangered pedestrians and impacted important events like the Cape Town Cycle Tour.

The Civic Centre trunk station of the MyCiTi bus rapid transit system is located along Hertzog Boulevard beneath the Tower Block.

References

Buildings and structures in Cape Town
Government of Cape Town
City and town halls in South Africa